Manning, until 1910 The Manning, an electoral district of the Legislative Assembly in the Australian state of New South Wales, had two incarnations, from 1894 to 1904 and from 1988 to 1991.


Election results

Elections in the 1980s

1988

1904 - 1988

Elections in the 1900s

1901

Elections in the 1890s

1898

1895

1894

References

New South Wales state electoral results by district